Trigona dallatorreana, known as irapuá-vermelha ("red irapuá bee") in Brazil, is a species of eusocial stingless bee in the family Apidae and tribe Meliponini.

References 

dallatorreana
Hymenoptera of South America
Hymenoptera of Brazil
Insects described in 1900